Carlo Zotti (born 3 September 1982) is an Italian former professional footballer who played as a goalkeeper.

Club career
Zotti was born in Foglianise, Benevento. He started his career at A.S. Roma, but his first-team experience was limited due to the presence of experienced goalkeepers Francesco Antonioli, Ivan Pelizzoli and Cristiano Lupatelli. He also had to compete with other young keepers such as Gianluca Curci. In 2004, he signed a five-year contract with Roma. In 2005, he was loaned to Ascoli Calcio 1898 to seek first team football.

He was back at Roma in the summer of 2006, but because Roma signed Julio Sergio Bertagnoli, Zotti became the 4th choice goalkeeper. Loaning him out proved a difficult task, so Zotti played for the Primavera side in the 2006–07 season. Due to this, he was finally sent on loan to U.C. Sampdoria in January 2007.

Zotti signed for Serie B team AS Cittadella in 2008, which Zotti terminated the contract with Roma by mutual consent, he joined than on 28 January 2009 to AC Bellinzona.

Zotti joined in 2012. In September, during a 3–2 away against FC Winterthur, he was substituted off due to an injury.

International career
Zotti was in the Italy U21 squad that won the 2004 European Under-21 Football Championship, but was an unused sub.

References

External links
 
 
 National Team stats. at FIGC official site
 Carlo Zotti Interview (1)
 Carlo Zotti Interview (2)
 Zotti: "I could have made another career: AC Milan is my great regret" 

1982 births
Living people
Sportspeople from Benevento
Association football goalkeepers
Italian footballers
Italy youth international footballers
Italy under-21 international footballers
A.S. Roma players
Ascoli Calcio 1898 F.C. players
U.C. Sampdoria players
AC Bellinzona players
A.S. Cittadella players
FC Wil players
FC Locarno players
Serie A players
Serie B players
Swiss Super League players
Swiss Challenge League players
Italian expatriate footballers
Italian expatriate sportspeople in Switzerland
Expatriate footballers in Switzerland
Footballers from Campania